President of the Council of Kumanovo Municipality (Macedonian Cyrillic: Претседател на Совет на Општина Куманово) is the President of the Council of  Kumanovo Municipality. Council has 33 members. The President and the Council work closely with the Mayor of Kumanovo.

President
Current President of the Council is Aleksandar Arsikj.
see also: List of presidents of Council of Kumanovo Municipality.

Obligations of the president of the Council:
Convenes and manages the sessions of the Council,
Takes care of the organization and work of the Council,
It signs the regulations adopted by the Council and within three days from the date of their adoption, submit them to the Mayor for publication.

See also
Kumanovo Municipality
Mayor of Kumanovo

References

Kumanovo Municipality
Kumanovo
Government of North Macedonia